Christoph Bode (born May 13, 1952 in Siegen/North Rhine-Westphalia) is a literary scholar. His fields are British and American literature, comparative literature, literary theory, narratology, and travel writing. He is full professor and chair of Modern English literature in the Department of English and American Studies at Ludwig-Maximilians-Universität München. Since 2009, Bode has been a reviewer and occasional columnist for Times Higher Education.

Early life and education 
Bode is the second child of the private language school director and university lecturer (Anglistik und Amerikanistik) Dr. Adolf Bode and his wife Ute Bode (born Kuß). Bode was educated in his home town of Siegen (1959–1971), before reading English and American literature, geography, and philosophy/pedagogy at Philipps-Universität Marburg, Germany, and University College Cardiff (1971–1976). After his graduation from Marburg in 1976 (state examination), Bode received his Ph.D. from the same university in 1978 (English and American literature, with philosophy/pedagogy as minor subject). This was followed by Bode's alternative service as conscientious objector (1978–1980).

Career in academia 
From 1977 to 1986, Bode was assistant professor and, from 1986 to 1992, associate professor at Christian-Albrechts-Universität Kiel, Germany. In 1989/90 he temporarily filled the position of a professor of English and American literature at Justus-Liebig-Universität Giessen, Germany. In 1992 he was made professor of English and American literature at Otto-Friedrich-Universität Bamberg, and in 1997 he was visiting professor at the University of California, Los Angeles. In 2000, Bode received the offer of a chair of English literature from the LMU Munich.

Focus in research and teaching 
Bode is a specialist in British, European, and American Romanticism and Modernist literature. With a background in philosophy and aesthetics (Ästhetik der Ambiguität, 1988), he is also a narratologist (The Novel, 2011; "Narrating Futures" project) and an expert in poetics. Other facets of his research include literary theory and travel writing. Bode has been the president of the Gesellschaft für englische Romantik (Society for English Romanticism) since 2001.

Memberships 
Bode is a member of some 15 learned societies and associations, among them
 Deutscher Anglistenverband (advisory board 1998-2002)
 North American Society for the Study of Romanticism (NASSR)
 British Association for Romantic Studies (BARS)
 Academia Europaea

Prizes, awards, fellowships 
 2007 Christensen Fellowship, University of Oxford (Visiting Fellow of St Catherine's College)
 2007 Corresponding Fellow, English Association, UK
 2007/08 Sabbatical year funded by the Deutsche Forschungsgemeinschaft (DFG) (German Research Foundation) for research on the discursive construction of identity in British Romanticism
 2008/09 Sabbatical year funded by the Exzellenzinitiative des Bundes for research on the History and Theory of British Travel Writing
 2009-12 Advanced Investigator Grant of the European Research Council (ERC): "Narrating Futures" project  (900.000 €). Bode was the first English Literature scholar in Europe to receive such a grant.
 2010 Fellow of the Center for Advanced Studies (CAS) at LMU Munich
 2011 Fellow of the Academia Europaea
 2013 Order of Merit of the Federal Republic of Germany (Merit Cross on Ribbon)

Referee and advisory boards 
Bode serves on about a dozen advisory boards, among them the European Research Council, Deutsche Forschungsgemeinschaft, Alexander von Humboldt-Stiftung, Volkswagenstiftung, Österreichische Akademie der Wissenschaften, Studienstiftung des deutschen Volkes, Fulbright Commission, Cusanus-Werk, European Romantic Review, Literature Compass, and Routledge.

Publications

Monographs 
Bode has published 15 Monographs, among them
 Aldous Huxley, "Brave New World, München: Wilhelm Fink Verlag, 1985. (Text und Geschichte: Modellanalysen zur englischen und amerikanischen Literatur, Bd. 13; utb 1312); 2., verbesserte Auflage 1993.
 Ästhetik der Ambiguität: Zu Funktion und Bedeutung von Mehrdeutigkeit in der Literatur der Moderne, Tübingen: Max Niemeyer Verlag, 1988. (Konzepte der Sprach- und Literaturwissenschaft, Bd. 4).
John Keats: "Play On", Heidelberg: Universitätsverlag C. Winter, 1996. (Anglistische Forschungen, Bd. 241).
 Der Roman: Eine Einführung, Tübingen: Francke, 2005 (second, enlarged edition 2011).
 Selbst-Begründungen: Diskursive Konstruktion von Identität in der britischen Romantik 1: Subjektive Identität, Trier: Wissenschaftlicher Verlag Trier, 2008.
 Fremd-Erfahrungen: Diskursive Konstruktion von Identität in der britischen Romantik 2: Identität auf Reisen, Trier: Wissenschaftlicher Verlag Trier, 2009.
 The Novel: An Introduction, Oxford/Malden, MA: Wiley-Blackwell, 2011.

Co-Editor 
Bode has co-edited 8 collections, among them
 Hugo Keiper and Richard J. Utz, Nominalism and Literary Discourse: New Perspectives, Amsterdam/Atlanta: Rodopi, 1997. (Critical Studies, Vol. 10).
 Ulrich Broich, Die Zwanziger Jahre in Großbritannien: Literatur und Gesellschaft einer spannungsreichen Dekade, Tübingen: Gunter Narr Verlag, 1998.
 Sebastian Domsch, British and European Romanticisms: Selected Papers from the Munich Conference of the German Society for English Romanticism, Trier: Wissenschaftlicher Verlag Trier, 2007.
 Jacqueline Labbe, Romantic Localities: Europe Writes Place, London: Pickering & Chatto, 2010.

Series Editor 
 As president of the Gesellschaft für englische Romantik, Bode has been co-editor of the series "Studien zur englischen Romantik" with Die Blaue Eule publishers, as of 2005 with WVT Trier.
 Co-editor, Münchener Universitätsschriften: Texte und Untersuchungen zur Englischen Philologie, Frankfurt/Main, Peter Lang Verlag (since 2007).
 Co-editor, Literatur - Kultur - Theorie, Würzburg, Ergon Verlag (since 2007).

Publications 
Bode has published well over 70 articles, among them
Look on my Works, ye Mighty, and despair!': Notes on the Non-teachability of Poetry, Anglistik & Englischunterricht Vol. 53 (1994): Teachable Poems from Sting to Shelley, 139-152.
 Why Theory Matters, Theories and Functions of Literature, eds. Rüdiger Ahrens, Laurenz Volkmann. Heidelberg, Universitätsverlag C. Winter, 1996, 87-100.
Beyond/Around/Into One's Own: Reiseliteratur als Paradigma von Welt-Erfahrung, Poetica 26: 1-2 (1994), 70-87.
Anglistische Literaturwissenschaft und/oder Cultural Studies?, Anglia 114: 3 (1996), 396-424.
Azores High, Iceland Low: The Location and Dynamics of Shakespeare's Meaning and Value, Historicizing/Contemporizing Shakespeare: Essays in Honour of Rudolf Böhm, eds. Christoph Bode, Wolfgang Klooß, Trier: WVT, 2000, 25-51.
Poststructuralist Pooh, Anglistentag 2000 Berlin: Proceedings, ed. Jürgen Schlaeger, Trier: WVT, 2001, 343-354.
 Unfit for an English Stage? Inchbald's Lovers' Vows and Kotzebue's Das Kind der Liebe, European Romantic Review 16, 3 (2005), 297-309.
Europe, Romanticism: An Oxford Guide, ed. Nicholas Roe, Oxford: Oxford University Press, 2005, 126-136.
"I have travelled a good deal in Concord": Romantic Cosmopolitanism and the Quest for the Universal in the Particular, Symbolism: An International Annual of Critical Aesthetics 7 (2007), 259-280.
 Discursive Constructions of the Self in British Romanticism, Romanticism and Victorianism on the Net, Issue 51, August 2008 [published in January 2009], Modelling the Self: Subjectivity and Identity in Romantic and Post-Romantic Thought and Culture, guest-edited by Mark Sandy and Sarah Wootton, 16pp.

Reviews 
There are some 60 reviews and handbook entries by Bode.

References

 "Bode, Christoph," in Kürschners Deutscher Gelehrten-Kalender, De Gruyter: Berlin (23rd ed.) 2011. 
 Ludwig-Maximilians-Universität München, Bode, Christoph in Annual Report on English and American Studies (AREAS), eds. Anja Holderbaum, Anne Kimmes, Joachim Kornelius, Trier: WVT, 1 ff. (1991 ff.) (biannual)

External links 
Website of Prof. Dr. Christoph Bode (in German)
List of publications of Prof. Dr. Christoph Bode

Gesellschaft für englische Romantik (in English)

1952 births
Living people
Linguists from Germany
Academic staff of the University of Bamberg
Ludwig Maximilian University of Munich alumni
Recipients of the Cross of the Order of Merit of the Federal Republic of Germany